James Stonhouse (1716–1795) was an English, physician, cleric and 11th baronet.

James Stonhouse may also refer to:

Sir James Stonhouse, 10th Baronet (c. 1719–1792), of the Stonhouse baronets
Sir James Stonhouse, 1st Baronet (d. c. 1652), of the Stonhouse baronets
Sir James Stonhouse, 2nd Baronet (d. c. 1654), of the Stonhouse baronets